The Ruined House (lit. The House that was Destroyed) is an originally Hebrew language book by Reuven Namdar written and set in New York City. The book was the 2014 winner of the Sapir Prize.

References

New York City in fiction
2014 novels
Hebrew-language novels